The Stockholm municipal election of 1998 was held on 15 September 1998, concurrently with the 1998 Swedish general election.  Using a party-list proportional representation system to allocate the 101 seats of the Stockholm city council (Stockholms kommunfullmäktige) amongst the various Swedish political parties.  Voter turnout was 76.9%.

The results for the Social Democrats were the lowest in decades, and for the first time since the initiation of universal male suffrage in 1911, the Moderates outnumbered the Social Democrats to become the largest party on the Stockholm City Council as a result of this election.

Results

See also
 Elections in Sweden
 List of political parties in Sweden
 City of Stockholm

Notes
  No separate election results were available for the Stockholm Party for the 1994 Stockholm municipal election, and thus year-to-year vote comparison is not possible.

References
Statistics Sweden, "Kommunfullmäktigval – valresultat" (Swedish) 
Statistics Sweden, "Kommunfullmäktigval – erhållna mandat efter kommun och parti. Valår 1973–2006" (Swedish) 
Swedish Election Authority (Valmyndigheten) 

Municipal elections in Stockholm
1998 elections in Sweden
1990s in Stockholm
September 1998 events in Europe